Ahmet Arslan (born 30 March 1994) is a German professional footballer who plays as a midfielder for Dynamo Dresden, on loan from Holstein Kiel.

Club career
Arslan is a youth exponent from Hamburger SV. On 28 November 2015, he made his Bundesliga debut against Werder Bremen.

In June 2020, it was announced Arslan would join 2. Bundesliga side Holstein Kiel from arch rivals VfB Lübeck. He signed a contract until 2024.

Personal life
Arslan is of Turkish descent.

References

External links
 

1994 births
Living people
People from Memmingen
Sportspeople from Swabia (Bavaria)
German people of Turkish descent
German footballers
Footballers from Bavaria
Association football midfielders
Bundesliga players
3. Liga players
Regionalliga players
1. FC Phönix Lübeck players
VfB Lübeck players
Hamburger SV II players
Hamburger SV players
VfL Osnabrück players
Holstein Kiel players
Dynamo Dresden players